East Mamprusi Municipal Assembly is one of the six districts in North East Region, Ghana. Originally created as an ordinary district assembly in 1988 when it was known as East Mamprusi District, which was created from the former Mamprusi District Council, until the eastern part of the district was split off by a decree of president John Agyekum Kufuor on 19 August 2004 to create Bunkpurugu-Yunyoo District; thus the remaining part has been retained as East Mamprusi District. However on 15 March 2018, it was elevated to municipal district assembly status to become East Mamprusi Municipal District. The municipality is located in the eastern part of North East Region and has Gambaga as its capital town.

Area 
It covers a land mass of 1,706.8 km2.

Geographical Structure 
To the north, it shares boundaries with Talensi and Nabdam Districts, Bawku West and Garu Districts, all in the Upper East Region and to the east is the Bunkpurugu Nyankpanduri District. It is bordered in the west by the West Mamprusi Municipal and to the south by the Gushiegu Municipal and Karaga District.

Political and Administrative Structure 
The District has a Town Councils (Nalerigu), 3 Area Councils (Langbinsi, Sakogu and Gbintri) and 36 Unit Committees. The District Assembly has 36 elected members, 15 Government appointees, one Member of Parliament, and a Municipal Chief Executive (MCE) who is the executive and administrative head of the District. The MCE is assisted by the Municipal Co-ordinating Director and his technical team as the technocrats and advisers of the DCE.

Cultural and Social Structure 
The Nayiri is the King (overlord) of Mamprugu traditional area and has council of elders who advise him. The Nayiri is supported by paramount chiefs, Divisional and other sub-chiefs under him. His paramountcies extend beyond the boundaries of the Municipality and are located in other Regions and Districts. Notable among the chiefs are the Wulugu Naaba, Wungu Naaba, Soo Naaba, Kulgu Naaba, Gambaga Naaba.

Mamprusi people are the major ethnic group in the Municipality. However, there are also Bimobas, Konkombas, Talensis, Mossis, Chakosis and Hausas who have settled in the area. Two traditional festivals are celebrated annually, Damba Festival, Bugum (Fire) Festival. The District is a multi-religious one with the dominant religions being Christianity, Islam and Traditional religion.

Tourism 
The district has some tourist attraction sites such as:

 The Gambaga Escarpment and White Volta River which stretch across the northern boundary of the district
 The NaYiri Palace also in Nalerigu
 NaJeringa Defense Wall
 Mossi chiefs' ancestral grave sites in Gambaga
 The pre-historic Gingana rock paintings

Economy 
The District has three functional markets at Gbintiri, Nalerigu and Langbinsi which serve as sources of revenue for the District Assembly. The main means of transportation for the people are motor bikes, bicycles as well as commercial vehicles.

Sources
 
 GhanaDistricts.com

References

North East Region, Ghana